Goldenisland (Kilmaine) is a townland in Athlone, County Westmeath, Ireland. The townland is in the civil parish of St. Mary's.

The townland is located on the banks of the River Shannon, to the south of the Athlone, and is bordered by Goldenisland (St. George) to the east, Goldenisland to the south, and the townland of Athlone to the north.

The townland contains the Golden Island Shopping Centre and Burgess Park.

References 

Townlands of County Westmeath